Acorn School District or Acorn Public Schools was a school district headquartered in Acorn, an unincorporated area in Polk County, Arkansas, United States, about  from Mena. Schools included Acorn Elementary School and Acorn High School.

In addition to Acorn, it served a small section of Mena.

The Ouachita River School District was established by the merger of the Acorn School District and the Oden School District on July 1, 2004.

References

Further reading
These include maps of predecessor districts:
 Map of Arkansas School Districts pre-July 1, 2004
 (Download)

External links
 

Defunct school districts in Arkansas
Education in Polk County, Arkansas
2004 disestablishments in Arkansas
School districts disestablished in 2004